Ernie Leo Triplett (September 25, 1906 in Barry, Illinois – March 5, 1934 in El Centro, California) was an American racecar driver. He was American Automobile Association Pacific Southwest champion in 1931 and 1932. Triplett died from injuries sustained in a crash during a AAA Pacific Southwest "big car" race at Imperial, California.

Career awards
Triplett was named to the National Sprint Car Hall of Fame in 1991.

Indianapolis 500 results

References

External links

1906 births
1934 deaths
Indianapolis 500 drivers
National Sprint Car Hall of Fame inductees
People from Barry, Illinois
Racing drivers from Illinois
Racing drivers who died while racing
Sports deaths in California
AAA Championship Car drivers